Douglas Annesley David Stupart (30 March 1882 – 6 May 1953) was a South African track and field athlete who competed in the 1908 Summer Olympics. In 1908 he finished tenth in the triple jump event. He also participated in the 110 metre hurdles competition but was eliminated in the first round.

References

External links
profile

1882 births
1953 deaths
South African male hurdlers
South African male triple jumpers
Olympic athletes of South Africa
Athletes (track and field) at the 1908 Summer Olympics